Founded in 2001, the Native American Composers Apprenticeship Project (NACAP) is an outreach program of the Grand Canyon Music Festival that is dedicated to teaching Native American young people to compose concert music. Each year, young musicians work with a Native American composer and a string quartet in residence in partnership with their school's music program. For the 2011 season, the Sphinx Organization's Catalyst Quartet participated as NACAP's first Fellowship Ensemble.

In 2007 New York's WNYC aired a feature about the project on its program Soundcheck, narrated by Ralph Farris of the string quartet ETHEL. 

NACAP is a winner of Arizona Governor's Arts Award for Arts in Education and in 2011 was presented with a National Arts and Humanities Youth Program Award by First Lady Michelle Obama.

Composers-in-residence 
2004–2019 - Raven Chacon (Navajo) 
2006 - Adam Overton
2003 - Jerod Impichchaachaaha' Tate (Chickasaw)
2003 - David Mallamud
2001–2002 - Brent Michael Davids (Mahican)

String Quartets-in-residence 
2015 - present - Sweet Plantain Quartet: Eddie Venegas, Joe Deninzon, Edward W. Hardy (2015), Orlando Wells, and Leo Grinhauz. 
2012 - present - Catalyst Quartet
2005 - 2012 - ETHEL
2004 - Calder Quartet
2003 - Avalon Quartet
2002 - Corigliano Quartet
2001 - Miró Quartet

See also 
First Nations Composer Initiative
Native American music

References

External links 
Native American Composers Apprenticeship Project official site
NACAP Alumni Audio Samples

Native American organizations
Music organizations based in the United States
Internship programs
Apprenticeship
Native American arts organizations